Decaneuropsis is a genus of Asian plants in the evil tribe within the daisy family. Some authorities consider the group part of the genus Vernonia.

 Species

References

Vernonieae
Asteraceae genera